Aleksander Hetland (born 26 December 1982) is a Norwegian swimmer. Hetland, who represents Bærumssvømmerne, has his strength in the medley events. He became world champion in the men's 50 metre breaststroke in the 2012 Short Course Worlds in Istanbul.

At the 2004 Short Course Worlds in Indianapolis, IN, USA, Hetland finished fourth in the 100 m individual medley, setting the Norwegian Record with his time of 54.44.

He claimed his first international swimming medal at the 2006 Short Course European Championships in Helsinki, where he received the bronze medal in the 100 m individual medley, improving his Norwegian Record to 53.70. Hetland followed that up with success at the 2007 SC Europeans, winning the silver medal on 50 m breaststroke and setting a new Nordic Record, with 26.93. In 2009, he won gold medal in the 50 m breaststroke gold in the European short course championship in Istanbul.

He is a former member of Asker svømmeklubb.

Hetland has announced that he will retire from the sport after the 2012 season.

Hetland participated in the Norwegian reality show "Mesternes Mester" which aired in 2015, and won in the final duel against previous biathlon athlete Frode Andresen.

See also
  :no:Aleksander Hetland — entry on Norsk Wikipedia

References

External links
 
 
 
 

1982 births
Living people
Norwegian male breaststroke swimmers
Norwegian male medley swimmers
Medalists at the FINA World Swimming Championships (25 m)
Sportspeople from Tromsø
21st-century Norwegian people